The Rohrbach Ro VII Robbe was an all-metal, twin engine flying boat built in Germany in the 1920s. It could be adapted to commercial or military rôles.

Design and development

As the full company name (Rohrbach Metall-Flugzeugbau) makes clear, all Rohrbach aircraft were all-metal, including their duralumin skinning. The Robbe was a monoplane with a high wing described at the time as a semi-cantilever structure, meaning that there were no rigid wing struts but that it retained external bracing with flying wires to the wings from the lower fuselage. The wings were mounted with 5° of dihedral. In plan they were straight tapered, with unswept leading edges and blunt tips. Internally the wings were built around single box spars, assisted by leading edge and trailing edge boxes. The edge boxes also served as fuel tanks. At this time there were still doubts about the repairability of metal aircraft, so the Robbe's two-part wing was designed to be easy to inspect internally by the removal of the edge boxes and all parts were replaceable.  The wing skin was riveted to the ribs.

The hull was flat-sided and deep. Its underside had two steps; in front of the first the hull bottom was a hollow V in section and behind it a flat V. There was a little water rudder behind the rear step. Pilot and mechanic sat side by side in an open cockpit, with gunner's positions ahead of them and at the trailing edge.  Alternatively, the Robbe could be configured to carry four passengers, one in a forward cabin, two in a central one and one more in a rear cabin, or to carry goods or post. The hull was divided into seven watertight compartments to preserve buoyancy. An unusual feature of each gunner's cockpit was a duralumin, telescopic mast. If, in an emergency the Robbe alighted without power, these could each be extended and a simple, triangular sail raised to reach safety.  At the rear the tail was conventional, with a blunted rectangular fin and small unbalanced rudder. The high aspect ratio horizontal tail, again rectangular apart from blunted tips, was mounted well up the fin and strut-braced to the upper fuselage. Like the rudder, the elevators were unbalanced.

To keep them clear of the spray of take-off, each of the Robbe's two  BMW IV water-cooled six cylinder upright inline engines was mounted in pusher configuration high above the wings on vertical faired steel tube N-form struts, the forward inner one particularly sturdy, and with transverse V-strut bracing with its apex on the central, upper fuselage. The engines were cooled with radiators in the front of the engine cowling and behind shutters controlled from the cockpit. There was a reserve fuel tank above each engine.

The Robbe had upward tilted, stabilizing, chined floats at about one third span, each mounted on N-form struts and transversely braced with converging struts to the wing below the engine mountings. Each float was divided into three watertight compartments.

Operational history

The first flight of the Robbe I, as the model described above became known, was in 1925. By the following summer two had been built and were taking part in a seaplane contest on the Warnemünde, though they did not complete it.

A Robbe participated in a competition for a seaworthy reconnaissance flying boat in the Netherlands from 18 October until 21 October. It did not earn a contract.

Robbe II

Rorhbach built a third Ro VII, the Robbe II. Though the layout was the same as the Robbe I and some elements were common to both, the Robbe II was considerably larger and more powerful. Pilot and mechanic had a low glazed enclosed cockpit ahead of the wing leading edge. Since the Robbe II was about 50% heavier than the earlier version it required more power. Construction began with the intention of fitting a pair of  BMW V water-cooled six-cylinder inline engines but when completed it had a pair of BMW VI V-12s, each developing .

It flew for the first time in the last quarter of 1927 in passenger configuration, with four porthole style windows in the cabin walls.

Its range was about 17% lower and ceiling 5% lower than those of the earlier version.

Variants
Ro VII Robbe I First version, with  BMW IV 6-cylinder engines. 
Ro VII Robbe II Larger and heavier, with  BMW VI V-12 engines.

Specifications (BMW IV engine)

References

Flying boats
1920s German aircraft
Rohrbach aircraft
Twin-engined pusher aircraft
High-wing aircraft
Aircraft first flown in 1925